"A Little in Love" is a song co-written and recorded by Canadian country music artist Paul Brandt for his 1997 album Outside the Frame. It was released as the first single from that album, where it reached number 45 on the Billboard Hot Country Singles & Tracks chart and number 1 on the Canadian RPM Country Tracks chart.

Chart performance

Year-end charts

References

1997 singles
Paul Brandt songs
Songs written by Josh Leo
Song recordings produced by Josh Leo
Reprise Records singles
Songs written by Rick Bowles
1997 songs